La Bala may refer to:

 La Bala (album), an album by Ana Tijoux
 La Bala (YouTuber), a Mexican YouTuber
 "La Bala", a track on the 2010 album Entren Los Que Quieran by Calle 13